Mauritius has strong and friendly relations with the West, with South Asian countries and with the countries of southern and eastern Africa. It is a member of the World Trade Organization, the Commonwealth of Nations, La Francophonie, the African Union, the Southern Africa Development Community, the Indian Ocean Commission, COMESA, and the recently formed Indian Ocean Rim Association.

Trade, commitment to democracy, and the country's small size are driving forces behind Mauritian foreign policy. The country's political heritage and dependence on Western markets have led to close ties with the European Union and its member states, particularly the United Kingdom and France. Mauritius' only immediate neighbour is Reunion Island, an overseas department of France that is also part of the European Union.

Considered part of Africa geographically, Mauritius has friendly relations with other African states in the region, particularly South Africa, by far its largest continental trading partner. Mauritian investors are gradually entering African markets, notably Madagascar and Mozambique. Mauritius coordinates much of its foreign policy with the Southern Africa Development Community and the Organisation of African Unity.  The country is also a member of the Port Management Association of Eastern and Southern Africa (PMAESA).

Relations with France and India are strong for both historical and commercial reasons. Foreign embassies in Mauritius include Australia, South Korea, the United Kingdom, People's Republic of China, Egypt, France, India, Madagascar, Pakistan, Russian Federation, Bangladesh, and the United States.

Mauritius is also a member of the International Criminal Court with a Bilateral Immunity Agreement of protection for the US-military (as covered under Article 98).

International disputes

Mauritius claims the entire Chagos Archipelago in the Indian Ocean and also claims the whole French-administered Tromelin Island.

Bilateral relations

List of countries which Mauritius maintains diplomatic relations with:

International organisations
Mauritius has been a member state of the United Nations and the Commonwealth of Nations since independence in 1968.

It is a member of the World Trade Organization, La Francophonie, Organisation of African Unity, the Southern Africa Development Community, the Indian Ocean Commission, COMESA, and the recently formed Indian Ocean Rim Association.

See also
 List of diplomatic missions in Mauritius
 List of diplomatic missions of Mauritius

References

 
Government of Mauritius
Politics of Mauritius
Mauritius and the Commonwealth of Nations